Anne Dorval (born November 8, 1960) is a French-Canadian television, stage, and film actress. She is known for her work with Xavier Dolan that includes appearing in five of his films, I Killed My Mother (2009), Heartbeats (2010), Laurence Anyways (2012), Mommy (2014) and Matthias & Maxime (2019). She has won five Gémeaux Awards for her work on television.

Early life
Dorval was born in Noranda, Quebec, the daughter of Madeleine (Larouche) and Gaetan Dorval. She received her education at Cégep de Trois-Rivières and the Drama Conservatory of Montreal, beginning her career on the stage in 1984.

Career
She is known in Canada for her appearance in the Quebec television series Le Coeur a ses raisons and Les Parent. She has also appeared in other Quebec series, such as Chambres en ville, Virginie, Paparazzi and Rumeurs, and in the films Montréal vu par... and I Killed My Mother (J'ai tué ma mère). She is also known as a premiere French Canadian voice actress for English films.

In 2010, at the Palm Springs International Film Festival, she won the FIPRESCI Award for Best Actress for her performance in I Killed My Mother (J'ai tué ma mère) directed by Xavier Dolan.

Personal life 
She was formerly married to actor Marc-André Coallier, with whom she had two children.

Filmography

References

External links 

 
 Anne Dorval

1960 births
Canadian film actresses
Canadian voice actresses
Canadian television actresses
French Quebecers
Living people
People from Rouyn-Noranda
Actresses from Quebec
20th-century Canadian actresses
21st-century Canadian actresses
Best Actress Genie and Canadian Screen Award winners
Best Actress Jutra and Iris Award winners